Air Marshal Christopher Mark Nickols,  (born 23 July 1956) is a retired senior officer in the Royal Air Force, whose final appointment was Chief of Defence Intelligence. Prior to that he served as Assistant Chief of the Defence Staff (Operations).

RAF career
Educated at St Edmund's School in Canterbury and having read engineering at Downing College, Cambridge, Nickols joined the Royal Air Force in 1974. He served as a pilot, flying Jaguars in Germany for 9 years before becoming Officer Commanding No. 2 Squadron in 1993. He was appointed Director of the UK Combined Air Operations Centre in 1997, Deputy Assistant Chief of Staff at Permanent Joint Headquarters at Northwood during the Kosovo War and then Station Commander at RAF Lossiemouth in 2000. He was also Air Commodore Offensive Operations at Headquarters No. 1 Group, and was Director of the Combined Air Operations Centre for four months in 2003 during the Iraq War. He was made Assistant Chief of the Defence Staff (Operations) in 2005 and Chief of Defence Intelligence in 2009.

Nickols is Chairman of the RAF Polo Association, and a Deputy Lieutenant of Kent.

References

1956 births
Living people
Companions of the Order of the Bath
Commanders of the Order of the British Empire
Deputy Lieutenants of Kent
Royal Air Force air marshals
Alumni of Downing College, Cambridge
People educated at St Edmund's School Canterbury